Nuestra Belleza Guanajuato 2012, was a beauty pageant, held at the Centro Explora of León, Guanajuato on July 6, 2012. At the conclusion of the final night of competition, Elisa Espinoza from Celaya was crowned the winner. Espinoza was crowned by outgoing Nuestra Belleza Mundo México titleholder Mariana Berumen. Eight contestants competed for the title.

Results

Placements

Contestants

References

External links
Official Website

 

Nuestra Belleza México
Beauty pageants in Mexico